Black Mesa is a rocket testing facility of the US Army in Utah. Many rockets of the Pershing type have been launched for testing from Black Mesa between 1963 and 1971.

References

External links 
 Astronautix.com: Black Mesa Test Range

Formerly Used Defense Sites in Utah
Rocket launch sites in the United States
Research installations of the United States Army